Matthew J. Munn (born 1980) is an American voice actor and animator for various studios. He was the voice of Boog and Doug in Open Season 3; he replaced Mike Epps as the voice of Boog from Open Season 2 (who replaced Martin Lawrence from the first film), but was replaced by Donny Lucas in Open Season: Scared Silly.

Filmography

Film

References

External links
 
 
 

1981 births
Living people
American male voice actors
Sony Pictures Animation people